Ibalia is a genus of ibaliid wasps in the family Ibaliidae. There are about 14 described species in Ibalia. All species are parasitoids of Siricidae species, which they seek out by detecting volatiles emitted by the fungi Siricidae larvae feed on, Amylostereum.

Species
These 14 species belong to the genus Ibalia:

 Ibalia anceps Say, 1824
 Ibalia aprilina Kerrich, 1973
 Ibalia arizonica Liu & Nordlander, 1992
 Ibalia hunanica Liu & Nordlander, 1994
 Ibalia jakowlewi Jacobson, 1899
 Ibalia japonica Matsumura, 1912
 Ibalia kirki Liu & Nordlander, 1992
 Ibalia leucospoides (Hochenwarth, 1785)
 Ibalia mirabilis Yasumatsu, 1941
 Ibalia montana Cresson, 1879
 Ibalia ornata Belizin, 1968
 Ibalia ruficollis Cameron, 1884
 Ibalia rufipes Cresson, 1879
 † Ibalia electra Engel & Liu, 2012

References

Further reading

External links

 

Parasitic wasps
Articles created by Qbugbot
Cynipoidea